Peter Biegen is an American screenwriter, playwright and filmmaker. He co-wrote the screenplay The Last Lullaby (with Max Allan Collins) and wrote and directed the short film Ceremonies of the Horsemen  (starring Richard Schiff and Josh Zuckerman). The short was selected to be part of the permanent archive at the Visual Center of Yad Vashem in Jerusalem.

Biegen has written for Lifetime television, ghost written on several projects, is a member of both the Writers Guild of America and the Writers Guild of Canada, and a 2014 fellow of the Sundance Institute. He was a writer on the 2017 series The Mist.

Biegen has developed film projects with Michael Apted, Rodrigo Garcia, Julie Lynn, Eric Stoltz and Don Was (among others).

Biegen is also an executive of Parrot Dice Pictures in Los Angeles, and was the host of the internet radio show "The Parrot Dice Pictures Radio Program" from 2009 through 2011.

References

External links 

Living people
Year of birth missing (living people)